Rabak Airport  was an airport formerly serving the cities of Kosti and Rabak in the White Nile State of Sudan. The dirt runways have been overbuilt with housing.

References

Airports in Sudan